Broken Bells is an American indie rock band composed of artist-producer Brian Burton (better known as Danger Mouse) and James Mercer, the lead vocalist and guitarist for the indie rock band The Shins. Broken Bells compose and create as a duo, but are joined by Dan Elkan and Jon Sortland when performing live.  The previous live band included Conor Oberst and the Mystic Valley Band sidemen Nate Walcott and Nik Freitas, and Jonathan Hischke and Dan Elkan, both ex-members of Hella. Following their 2010 self-titled debut album, the duo released an EP, Meyrin Fields, in 2011 and their second studio album, After the Disco, in 2014.

History
Brian Burton and James Mercer decided to work together after meeting at the Roskilde Festival in 2004 and finding they were fans of each other's work. By March 2008, Mercer and Burton had finally begun recording together in secret at Burton's Los Angeles-based studio. The project was first announced on September 29, 2009. The two described their material as "melodic, but experimental, too."

Prior to the formation of Broken Bells, Mercer and Burton both worked together on the track "Insane Lullaby" on the album Dark Night of the Soul by Danger Mouse and Sparklehorse.  Broken Bells have since performed the song several times, often as a tribute to the late Mark Linkous, the Sparklehorse frontman who died in early 2010.

Broken Bells' self-titled debut album was released in the United States and Canada on March 9, 2010 through Columbia Records, and has sold over 400,000 copies domestically, peaking at number 7 on the Billboard 200 chart. The album has received positive reviews. Rolling Stone magazine gave it a four-star review and stated that it was "the year’s coolest left field pop disc." Besides their album being among the year’s highest charting debut albums, the band had sold-out shows on their first-ever tour.

Broken Bells released an EP titled Meyrin Fields on March 18, 2011.

On February 14, 2012, in an interview with KINK.FM (a Portland, Oregon radio station), James Mercer stated that he was currently working on Broken Bells' second album. On October 8, 2013, the band announced the release of its second album, After the Disco. Broken Bells released their lead single from the album, titled "Holding on for Life", on November 4, 2013. After the Disco was released on February 4, 2014. That same day they covered "And I Love Her" alongside footage of Ringo Starr on an old television as part of the "Late Show With David Letterman" "Beatles Week" to celebrate the 50th anniversary of the band's debut appearance on "Ed Sullivan". The band performed "Holding on for Life" on the March 7, 2014 episode of "The Tonight Show Starring Jimmy Fallon". On December 7, 2018, they released "Shelter", their first single in 3 years.  A follow up single, "Good Luck", was issued on September 27, 2019.

The first single from their third album, Into the Blue, "We're Not in Orbit Yet...", was released on June 29, 2022, after an eight-year hiatus. They issued a new single, "Saturdays", on August 10, 2022. On September 21, they released a new single titled “Love On The Run”.

Members
Official members
James Mercer – lead vocals, guitars, bass, keyboards
Brian Burton (Danger Mouse) – keyboards, bass, drums, production
Touring members
Dan Elkan – guitar, bass, keyboards, vocals
Jon Sortland – drums, keyboards, bass, vocals

Discography

Studio albums

Extended plays

Singles

Promotional singles

Awards and nominations
Broken Bells were nominated at the 2011 Grammy Awards for Best Alternative Music Album.

Notes

References

External links
 
 LAist - Broken Bells Live Debut at The Bootleg Theater - Review and Photos
 Broken Bells on NPR's World Cafe - 2010 Interview and live performance

Alternative rock groups from California
Indie rock musical groups from California
American musical duos
Musical groups established in 2009
American space rock musical groups
Rock music supergroups